Born Diva is a Philippine reality show on ABS-CBN and internationally on The Filipino Channel, hosted by Zsa Zsa Padilla. It aired from August 28 to November 27, 2004, replacing Star in a Million.

Overview

Finalists
Shayne Corpuz
Reema Lucida
Raki Vega
Jenna Pascual
Desiree Sandoval
Sophia Montecarlo
Athena Soler
Shanice Michaels

Contestants

See also
List of programs aired by ABS-CBN
Little Big Star
Little Big Superstar
Search for the Star in a Million
Tawag ng Tanghalan

ABS-CBN original programming
Philippine reality television series
2004 Philippine television series debuts
2004 Philippine television series endings
Filipino-language television shows